Jerry Turner (born April 10, 1978) is an American football defensive end who is a free agent. He was signed by the Alabama Steeldogs as an undrafted free agent in 2001. He played college football at Tennessee Technological University.

On June 9, 2016, Turner was assigned to the Tampa Bay Storm.

On May 11, 2017, Turner signed with the Monterrey Steel.

References

External links
Arena Football League bio

1978 births
Living people
American football defensive ends
Tennessee Tech Golden Eagles football players
Alabama Steeldogs players
Bakersfield Blitz players
Las Vegas Gladiators players
Kansas City Brigade players
Arkansas Twisters players
Spokane Shock players
Georgia Force players
Jacksonville Sharks players
Tampa Bay Storm players
Monterrey Steel players
Players of American football from Birmingham, Alabama